Yakov Sannikov (January 29, 1780, Ust-Yansk – 1810s, Sakha Republic) was a Russian merchant and explorer of the New Siberian Islands.

In 1800, Sannikov discovered and charted Stolbovoy Island, and in 1805 Faddeyevsky Island. In 1809–1810, he took part in the expedition led by Matvei Gedenschtrom. In 1810, Sannikov crossed the island of New Siberia and a year later explored Faddeyevsky Island. He also discovered Bunge Land, and suggested that there was a vast land north of the Kotelny Island. This hypothetical island has become known as Sannikov Land.

Sannikov died in the 1810s, most likely in 1812. A strait between Maly Lyakhovsky and the Kotelny islands bears Sannikov's name.

References

1780 births
1810s deaths

Year of death uncertain
People from Ust-Yansky District
Russian and Soviet polar explorers
Explorers from the Russian Empire
Explorers of Asia
New Siberian Islands
Russian merchants
19th-century businesspeople from the Russian Empire